Roxbury Charter High Public School was a secondary school located in Roxbury, Massachusetts, United States.  The school first opened in 2003. It closed in 2006.

References

External links
Roxbury Charter High Public School website archived from the original
 Jan, Tracy.  "Judge says school can stay open for now", The Boston Globe, October 19, 2005.  Retrieved October 22, 2005.
 Jewell, Mark.  "Appeals court ruling mixed on future of Roxbury charter school"  The Boston Globe, October 18, 2005.  Retrieved October 22, 2005.

Defunct schools in Massachusetts
Educational institutions disestablished in 2006
Educational institutions established in 2003
High schools in Boston
Charter schools in Massachusetts
Public high schools in Massachusetts
Roxbury, Boston
2003 establishments in Massachusetts
2006 disestablishments in Massachusetts